The Red Rider is a 1925 American silent Western film directed by Clifford Smith. It is not known whether the film currently survives.

Cast
 Jack Hoxie as White Elk
 Mary McAllister as Lucy Cavanaugh
 Jack Pratt as Black Panther
 Natalie Warfield as Nautauka
 Marin Sais as Silver Waters
 William McCall as John Cavanaugh
 Francis Ford as Brown Bear
 George Connors as Tom Fleming
 William Welsh as Ben Hanfer
 Clark Comstock as Indian Chief

References

External links
 

1925 films
1925 Western (genre) films
American black-and-white films
Films directed by Clifford Smith
Silent American Western (genre) films
1920s American films